Achina may refer to:

 Achina, Bhiwani, a village in India
 Achina, Anambra, a town in Nigeria
 Achina, Highland, a village in Scotland

See also
 Achin (disambiguation)